Iryna Zhuravska (Ірина Журавська; born January 14, 1990) is a Ukrainian model who represented her country in the Miss World 2008 pageant, which took place on December 13, 2008, in Johannesburg, South Africa. She placed among the top 15 semi-finalists in the pageant.

Life and career
Zhuravska was born in Kyiv, in Ukraine. At the time of her participation at the Miss World 2008 pageant, she was a second-year student at the Kyiv Pedagogical University, majoring in English.

As a model, Zhuravska has worked for many notable Ukrainian designers and appeared in TV commercials and music videos.  She signed with KARIN MMG agency, owned Ukrainian model Vlada Lytovchenko, who also won the Miss Ukraine pageant.  Zhuravska won the 2008 Miss Ukraine pageant and received a crown worth $500,000 and the right to represent Ukraine at Miss World. Previously, she won the titles Vice-Miss of Miss Donbas Open 2007, Miss Internet, and Miss Algora.  She also was a runner-up of Miss World Talent in 2008.

Zhuravska is a close relative of the Kyiv mayor-deputy, Vitaliy Zhuravsky. Vitaliy Zhuravsky, who later became a presidential adviser for Viktor Yanukovych, often attends the contest. There are some rumors from participants of the Miss Ukraine concourse that he might have influenced her award. Particularly such statement came from Miss Ukraine Universe 2006 Inna Tsymbalyuk who said that Zhuravska did not participate in qualifications, however, Vitaliy Zhuravsky denied any allegations to him.

References

External links
 Zhuravska won unfairly?! from TabloID

1990 births
Living people
Miss World 2008 delegates
Ukrainian female models
Ukrainian beauty pageant winners
Models from Kyiv